"Boogie 2nite" is a song by American singer Tweet from her debut studio album, Southern Hummingbird (2002). Tweet co-wrote the song with its producers, Nisan Stewart and John "Jubu" Smith. It was released on October 28, 2002, as the album's third and final single. The single's B-side, "Smoking Cigarettes", was also released as a promotional CD single. A music video for "Boogie 2nite" and "Smoking Cigarettes" was directed by Little X and filmed in Toronto over the weekend of September 28–29, 2002, but it was ultimately cancelled. "Boogie 2nite" was included on the soundtrack to the 2002 action thriller film The Transporter.

In 2006, the song was covered by English dance music duo Booty Luv, whose version peaked at number two on the UK Singles Chart. Following the release of Booty Luv's cover, Tweet's original song reached number 167 on the UK chart.

Track listings
UK CD single
 "Boogie 2nite" (album version) – 4:10
 "Boogie 2nite" (T&F Crushed DB Boulevard Club Re-edit) – 6:08
 "Smoking Cigarettes" (album version) – 4:17

UK 12-inch single
A1. "Boogie 2nite" (album version) – 4:10
A2. "Boogie 2nite" (T&F Crushed DB Boulevard Club Re-edit) – 6:08
B. "Smoking Cigarettes" (album version) – 4:17

UK 12-inch single – remixes
A. "Boogie 2nite" (Seamus Haji Boogie Mix) – 7:45
B1. "Boogie 2nite" (Seamus Haji 2nite Dub) – 7:48
B2. "Boogie 2nite" (acappella) - 4:57

Italian 12-inch single
A. "Boogie 2nite" (T&F Crushed DB Boulevard Dub)
B1. "Boogie 2nite" (T&F Crushed DB Boulevard Radio)
B2. "Boogie 2nite" (album version)

Credits and personnel
Credits adapted from the liner notes of Southern Hummingbird.

 Tweet – songwriting, vocals
 Dylan Dresdow – engineering, mixing
 Bernie Grundman – mastering
 John "Jubu" Smith – production, songwriting
 Nisan Stewart – production, songwriting

Charts

Release history

Booty Luv version

"Boogie 2nite" was originally remixed by Seamus Haji. A cover version of his remix by English dance music duo Booty Luv was then recorded for their debut studio album, Boogie 2nite (2007). The song was released on November 20, 2006, as the album's lead single via the Hed Kandi label. The single peaked at number two during its third week on the UK Singles Chart. Haji's remix of the track was promoted as the main version of the single, while the DB Boulevard version was used for the music video. The song is also featured in the 2009 expansion pack game Grand Theft Auto: The Ballad of Gay Tony.

Following the release of Booty Luv's 2009 single "Say It", "Boogie 2nite" re-entered the UK Dance Singles Chart at number 31 in September 2009, three years after its original release.

Track listings
UK CD 1
 "Boogie 2nite" (Seamus Haji Big Love Edit) – 3:16
 "Boogie 2nite" (DB Boulevard Edit) – 2:35

UK CD 2
 "Boogie 2nite" (Seamus Haji Big Love Edit) – 3:16
 "Boogie 2nite" (DB Boulevard Edit) – 2:35
 "Boogie 2nite" (Seamus Haji Big Love Remix) – 8:28
 "Boogie 2nite" (DB Boulevard Club Mix) – 6:10
 "Boogie 2nite" (Tommy Vee vs Keller Remix) – 7:15
 "Boogie 2nite" (Danny Freakazoid Remix) – 7:34
 "Boogie 2nite" (R&B Edit) – 4:23
 "Boogie 2nite" (video) – 2:34

UK 12-inch single
A1. "Boogie 2nite" (DB Boulevard Club Mix) – 6:19
A2. "Boogie 2nite" (Tommy Vee vs Keller Remix) – 7:15
B. "Boogie 2nite" (Seamus Haji Big Love Remix) – 8:28

Dutch CD single
 "Boogie 2nite" (Seamus Haji Big Love Edit) – 3:16
 "Boogie 2nite" (DB Boulevard Edit) – 2:35
 "Boogie 2nite" (Seamus Haji Big Love Club Mix) – 8:28
 "Boogie 2nite" (DB Boulevard Club Mix) – 6:10
 "Boogie 2nite" (Tommy Vee vs Keller Remix) – 7:15
 "Boogie 2nite" (Danny Freakazoid Remix) – 7:34

Belgian CD single
 "Boogie 2nite" (Seamus Haji Big Love Edit) – 3:16
 "Boogie 2nite" (DB Boulevard Edit) – 2:35
 "Boogie 2nite" (Seamus Haji Big Love Club Mix) – 8:28
 "Boogie 2nite" (video) – 2:34

French 12-inch picture disc
A. "Boogie 2nite" (Seamus Haji Big Love Remix) – 8:30
B1. "Boogie 2nite" (Tommy Vee vs Keller Remix) – 7:11
B2. "Boogie 2nite" (DB Boulevard Club Mix) – 6:08

Australian CD single
 "Boogie 2nite" (Seamus Haji Big Love Edit) – 3:16
 "Boogie 2nite" (DB Boulevard Edit) – 2:35
 "Boogie 2nite" (Seamus Haji Big Love Remix) – 8:28
 "Boogie 2nite" (DB Boulevard Club Mix) – 6:10
 "Boogie 2nite" (Tommy Vee vs Keller Remix) – 7:15

US CD maxi single
 "Boogie 2nite" (Seamus Haji Big Love Edit) – 3:16
 "Boogie 2nite" (Seamus Haji Big Love Remix) – 8:28
 "Boogie 2nite" (DB Boulevard Club Mix) – 6:10

German CD single
 "Boogie 2nite" (DB Boulevard Radio Edit) – 2:31
 "Boogie 2nite" (Seamus Haji Big Love Remix) – 3:13

German 12-inch single 
A1. "Boogie 2nite" (DB Boulevard Club Mix) – 6:10
A2. "Boogie 2nite" (Danny Freakazoid Remix) – 7:34
B. "Boogie 2nite" (Seamus Haji Big Love Club Mix) – 8:28

German 12-inch single 
A1. "Boogie 2nite" (Teddy-O Rmx)
A2. "Boogie 2nite" (Teddy-O Rmx Instrumental)
A3. "Boogie 2nite" (Accapella)
B1. "Boogie 2nite" (R'n B Edit)
B2. "Boogie 2nite" (DB Boulevard Club Mix)

Credits and personnel
Credits adapted from the liner notes of Boogie 2nite.

 Booty Luv – vocals
 Sarita Borge – additional programming, executive production, vocal production
 Walter Coelho – mastering
 Ben Cook – additional programming, executive production
 Paul Emanuel – drums, keyboards
 Dillon Gallagher – vocal engineering
 Seamus Haji – additional production, drums, keyboards, remix
 Dipesh Parmar – additional programming, executive production

Charts

Weekly charts

Year-end charts

Certifications

References

2002 songs
2002 singles
2006 debut singles
American disco songs
Booty Luv songs
Elektra Records singles
Songs about dancing
Songs written by Nisan Stewart
Songs written by Tweet (singer)
Tweet (singer) songs